Khomeini is an Iranian name, derived from the Iranian city of Khomein. The most prominent Khomeini is Ruhollah Khomeini.

Notable people named Khomeini include:
Ruhollah Khomeini, former Supreme Leader of Iran
Ahmad Khomeini, son of Ruhollah Khomeini
Mostafa Khomeini, son of Ruhollah Khomeini
Hussein Khomeini, grandson of Ruhollah Khomeini
Hassan Khomeini, grandson of Ruhollah Khomeini, son of Ahmad Khomeini

See also
Bandar-e Emam Khomeyni
Political thought and legacy of Ruhollah Khomeini
Tehran Imam Khomeini International Airport

Iranian-language surnames